Jamón jamón is a 1992 Spanish romantic tragicomedy film directed by Bigas Luna and starring Javier Bardem, Jordi Mollà and Penélope Cruz in her debut film. It centers on a young woman named Silvia (Cruz) who becomes pregnant by Jose Luis, the scion of a small but powerful underwear manufacturing empire, and the disastrous fallout of their relationship. The movie engages in word play and puns, and rhapsodises on the juxtaposition of old and new in Spain, as well as many other emotional contrasts such as erotic desire and food.

It is the first film of the so-called Trilogía ibérica by Bigas Luna, followed by Golden Balls (1992), and The Tit and the Moon (1994).

Plot
In a small Spanish town on the edge of the Monegros Desert, the beautiful teenager Silvia spends her evenings making potato omelettes to sell at the factory where she works as a seamstress for the Sansón Corporation, a small but powerful men's underwear company that, along with the local Conquistador ham processing plant, serves as one of the two major local employers. Her mother, Carmen runs a local bar which doubles as a brothel, and where she herself used to work as a prostitute. Though comfortably middle class now, Carmen still carries a stigma from the townspeople for her past.

Unbeknownst to anyone, Silvia has been having an affair with José Luis, the kind but spoiled and immature heir to the Sansón empire. One day, Silvia tells him that she is pregnant and José Luis impulsively proposes to her with a soda can tab, promising to provide her with a real engagement ring once he has sought his parents' permission for marriage. Fearing disinheritance, José Luis tentatively tells his parents that he is dating Silvia without informing them of the pregnancy. His mother, Conchita, who exerts the most influence over the company, refuses to bless the union. His father Manuel bows to his mother's wishes, while also expressing sympathy for Silvia and Carmen, the latter of whom he used to frequent when she was still a prostitute.

Conchita decides to ruin José Luis and Silvia's relationship by finding a man to seduce her. She chooses Raúl, a ham delivery driver and aspiring bullfighter whom she meets when he is selected as the new Sansón model; Conchita promises the materialistic and ambitious Raúl ample reward should he succeed in his task. After Silvia repels his advances several times, Raúl becomes genuinely attracted to her and begins trying to win her affection in earnest. Meanwhile, Conchita becomes sexually obsessed with Raúl herself and the two begin an affair. When José Luis repeatedly refuses to stand up to his parents, Silvia herself begins an affair with Raúl, while José Luis seeks solace with Carmen, revealed to have been his lover before he began dating Silvia. Amidst the various affairs, Silvia begins having surrealistic dreams containing images of shepherds guiding their flocks through the desert, pigs, and images of herself kneeling nude in the desert cradling ham bones.

Learning of Silvia's betrayal, José Luis forces himself upon Silvia to avenge himself against Raúl. Desperate to keep Raúl, Conchita seduces him at the isolated ham warehouse where he works. José Luis goes to Carmen and tells her that his relationship with Silvia is over, but she refuses to rekindle their affair; a devastated José Luis goes in search of Raúl. Meanwhile, Silvia, looking for José Luis, arrives at his home and encounters a departing Manuel, who makes advances on Silvia. Initially hesitant, she returns his advances.

José Luis tracks Raúl down to the ham warehouse and catches him with Conchita. The two men fight using ham legs as blunt weapons, ending with José Luis injuring Raúl and Raúl bludgeoning José Luis to death. Carmen, Silvia, and Manuel arrive and Silvia returns her soda can tab ring to José Luis's body before returning to Manuel; a weeping Carmen cradles José Luis's body while Conchita comforts Raúl. A shepherd arrives with his flock of sheep, recreating a tableau from Silvia's dreams.

Cast

Production
The film is a Lola Films production. It has the Monegros desert as backdrop. Shooting locations included Peñalba, Fraga, Monegrillo and La Almolda. Footage was shot near the Osborne bull (and the adjoining gas station) in Peñalba, a football pitch in Monegrillo, and a roadhouse near Candasnos.

Much of the dialogue and imagery in the film are composed of word play and visual puns. For example, in Spanish, jamón means "ham;" not only do two characters comment that Silvia's breasts taste like ham, but the phonetically similar jamona, which Raul calls Silvia, is Spanish slang for an unmarried woman.

Release 
The film premiered in Spain on 4 September 1992. It later screened at the 49th Venice International Film Festival.

Reception
Rotten Tomatoes gives the film a 69% rating from 16 reviews with the consensus: "It isn't as provocative or amusing as it pretends to be, but Jamón jamóns cheerfully overheated melodrama is often its own reward."

Ángel Fernández-Santos of El País wrote that the film "is uneven, it lurches and lurches, like a drifting canoe, but when it rises to the crest of its waves it reaches the memorable".

The film was number one in Spain and grossed $2.5 million. It was also number one in Italy and grossed a further $3.5 million in Europe.

Accolades 

|-
| align = "center" | 1992 || 49th Venice International Film Festival || Silver Lion || Bigas Luna ||  || 
|-
| align = "center" rowspan = "6" | 1993 || rowspan = "6" | 7th Goya Awards || colspan = "2" | Best Film ||  || rowspan = "6" | 
|-
| Best Director || Bigas Luna || 
|-
| Best Actor || Javier Bardem || 
|-
| Best Actress || Penélope Cruz || 
|-
| Best Original Screenplay || Cuca Canals, Bigas Luna || 
|-
| Best Sound || Miguel Rejas Ricard Casals || 
|}

Soundtrack
"Házmelo otra vez" (Concha Valdés Miranda)

See also 
 List of Spanish films of 1992

Informational notes

References

External links 
 
 

1992 films
1990s romantic comedy-drama films
1990s erotic drama films
Spanish romantic comedy-drama films
1990s Spanish-language films
Spanish satirical films
1990s sex comedy films
Films directed by Bigas Luna
Films set in Aragon
Films shot in the province of Huesca
Films shot in the province of Zaragoza
Spanish erotic drama films
1992 comedy films
1992 drama films
Films scored by Nicola Piovani
1990s Spanish films
LolaFilms films